Shanon David Carmelia (born 20 March 1989) is a Curaçaon footballer who plays for Dutch club USV Hercules as a  right back.

Career
Born in Boca Samí, Curaçao, in the former Netherlands Antilles, he formerly played for Deportivo Barber, NEC, JVC Cuijk and FC Lienden. Carmelia moved to Derde Divisie club vv DOVO after the 2019–20 season.

In February 2022 he signed for USV Hercules.

Honours

Club
IJsselmeervogels
Derde Divisie: 2016–17

International
Curaçao
 Caribbean Cup: 2017
 King's Cup: 2019

References

External links
 NEC

Caribbean Football Database

1989 births
Living people
Dutch Antillean footballers
Netherlands Antilles international footballers
Curaçao international footballers
Curaçao footballers
JVC Cuijk players
IJsselmeervogels players
FC Lienden players
Sekshon Pagá players
VV DOVO players
Tweede Divisie players
Derde Divisie players
2014 Caribbean Cup players
2017 CONCACAF Gold Cup players
Association football fullbacks
2019 CONCACAF Gold Cup players
People from Willemstad
USV Hercules players
NEC Nijmegen players
CRKSV Jong Colombia players
Centro Social Deportivo Barber players